Timidonella is a genus of large middle Jurassic forams, with microspheric tests up to  in diameter. Smaller megalospheric tests may be fan-shaped or kidney-shaped to discoidal with breadths to slightly over 2 mm and a constant thickness equal to that of the proloculus. Chambers are numerous. The wall, microgranular calcareous, agglutinated.

Timidonella has been found in the middle Jurassic of France, Italy, Sardinia, Iran, and Madagascar. Spiraloconulus, Streptocyclammina, and Spirocyclina are among related  genera.

References 

Loftusiida
Prehistoric Foraminifera genera
Toarcian life
Jurassic animals of Asia
Fossils of Thailand
Fossil taxa described in 1974